Cheraathukal is a 2021 Indian Malayalam-language anthology film, which has six stories, each painting different shades of love. The film is released on 17 June 2021 on 7 OTT platforms: Nee Stream, Saina Play, First Shows, High Hopes (HH), Zinea, Cave, FilMe, Koode, Roots Video and Limelight. Cheraathukal was shot during the pandemic with around 100 technicians while following all COVID-19 protocols.

List of short films

Plot 
There are six short films in this movie, each painting different shades of love.  Love is like an ocean and its vastness is what this movie tries to capture.

Veyil Veezhave 
The story depicts the bond between a caring bubbly young home nurse and the senior citizen whom she came to take care.

Narthaki  
This is the story of a dancer following her deep love towards her passion and finding that with the help of her love.

Diwa  
The Story starts with the development of a relationship and progressing to the escape of the female character from the clutches of evil when she trusted her instincts

Clara  
This is a tale of an everlasting love that prompts one to wait his entire life for his love.

Puzha  
A nun's love for the underprivileged and the marginalized and the cost she pays when the decision of a kind act delays.

Saamoohya Paadam  
This is a story of a youngster and his love for his own people and his urge to do something for them.

Cast

Music 

The sound design of the movie is done by Shefin Mayan. This movie has 3 songs.

References

2021 films
2020s Malayalam-language films